The Biarritz Ladies Open was a women's professional golf tournament on the Ladies European Tour held in Biarritz, France. It was first played in 1988 and held annually until 1990.

Winners

Source:

See also
Biarritz Ladies Classic

References

External links
Ladies European Tour

Former Ladies European Tour events
Defunct golf tournaments in France
Recurring sporting events established in 1988
Recurring sporting events disestablished in 1990